Cricket is a growing sport in Iceland, involving four club teams (Reykjavík Vikings, Kópavogur Puffins, Vesturbær Volcano and Hafnarfjörður Hammers) and the national side.  Iceland is not a member of the International Cricket Council (ICC), but has ambitions to become an associate  member of the ICC by 2024/25.

History

It is likely that cricket was introduced to the country in the 20th century by immigrants and expatriates from cricket-playing nations such as England, Australia, and India.  The 1944 edition of Wisden Cricketers' Almanack records two wartime games played between the Royal Air Force and the Royal Navy, with the Air Force winning by 36 runs in the first game and 24 runs in the second.

Efforts to grow participation in cricket by Icelanders are ongoing, however, there remains strong competition from more popular and established sports, such as football, handball, swimming, skiing and athletics.

Governing body
Cricket in Iceland is organised by Krikketsamband Íslands (the Icelandic Cricket Association). , they had 102 registered players.

National team

A national team was formed in 2008, and competed at the 2016 Pepsi Cup tournament in Prague, finishing fifth out of six teams. They played their first (unofficial) international match, a win against Switzerland, in England during July 2018. Members of the r/Cricket forum on Reddit had raised money for the team through crowdfunding and became their official sponsors.

Domestic teams

Former teams 
The first two domestic cricket teams were Kylfan and Stykkishólmur, who contested the inaugural Icelandic Cricket Cup in 2000. A third team, from the Tryggingamiðstöðin insurance company, was formed in 2001. In 2008, another works team was formed by employees of Tata. After 2008, only Kylfan survived, changing its name to Reykjavík.

Current teams 
Four municipalities regularly field teams in current domestic competitions:

 Reykjavík, nicknamed the Vikings, and formed by Ragnar Kristinsson in 2000.
 Kópavogur, nicknamed the Puffins, and formed by Abhi Chauhan in 2015.
 Hafnarfjörður, nicknamed the Hammers, and formed by Muhammad Younas in 2018.
 Vesturbær, nicknamed the Volcano, and formed by Kathir Narayanan in 2021.

Two other municipalities have occasionally fielded teams in current domestic competitions:

 Garðabær, nicknamed the Geysirs, participated in the Summer Solstice Sixes in 2018, 2019 and 2020.
 Seltjarnarnes, nicknamed the Sunsets, participated in the Summer Solstice Sixes in 2018.

List of honours 

 Reykjavík have won eight titles:
Icelandic Cricket Cup (2000, 2001, 2003), Volcanic Ashes (2017, 2019), Summer Solstice Sixes (2019, 2020), Sixty Ball Shootout (2021).
 Kópavogur have won eight titles:
Volcanic Ashes (2015, 2016, 2018, 2020, 2022), Íslensk Premier League (2020), Sixty Ball Shootout (2020), and Valhalla Cup (2022).
 Hafnarfjörður have won five titles:
Summer Solstice Sixes (2018, 2021), Íslensk Premier League (2021, 2022), and Sixty Ball Shootout (2022).
Tryggingamiðstöðin have won one title:
Icelandic Cricket Cup (2002)
Tata have won one title:
Icelandic Cricket Cup (2008)
Vesturbær have won no titles.

Summary of results 

Results correct to 31 December 2021.

Domestic competitions

Former competitions 
Iceland's first domestic cricket competition was the Icelandic Cricket Cup, played from 2000 to 2003, and revived in 2008 for one season.

The results were:

 2000 Reykjavík (Kylfan) beat Stykkishólmur at Stykkishólmur.
 2001 Reykjavík (Kylfan) beat Tryggingamiðstöðin at Tungubakkavellir.
 2002 Tryggingamiðstöðin beat Reykjavík (Kylfan) at Víðistaðatún.
 2003 Reykjavík (Kylfan) beat Stykkishólmur at Stykkishólmur.
 2008 Tata beat Reykjavík (Kylfan) at Klambratún.

Current competitions 
There are presently seven domestic cricket competitions in Iceland. The longest-running of these is the Volcanic Ashes, which began in 2015. 
 The Volcanic Ashes is an indoor cricket competition. It has been held annually since 2015. The trophy is a replica Ashes urn set in volcanic basalt. The urn contains ashes from every volcanic eruption in Iceland since the formation of the Icelandic Cricket Association in 1999. It is currently a three-match knockout tournament, with semi-finals and a final.
 The Íslensk Premier League is a Twenty20 competition. It has been held annually since 2020. It is a round-robin league, in which each club plays the others twice. There is no final.
 The Sixty Ball Shootout is a T10 competition. It has been held annually since 2020. It is a round-robin league, in which each club plays the others twice. There is no final.
 The Summer Solstice Sixes is a six-a-side competition. It has been held annually since 2018. It is a knockout tournament, with quarter-finals, semi-finals and a final. There are eight teams, since each club enters an A and B team.
 The Valhalla Cup is a 40-overs competition. It was first held in 2022. It is a three-match knockout tournament, with semi-finals and a final.
 The Ashes on Ice Test is a two-day, two innings a side competition between the winners of the Íslenskt Premier League and either the winners of the Sixty Ball Shootout or the runners-up of the ÍPL. It was first held in 2022 between Hafnarfjörður and Vesturbær, with the former winning by 17 runs. 
 The Samuel Gill Trophy is a 40-overs exhibition match, which traditionally closes the summer season. It has been held annually since 2020. Similar in principle to the Irani Trophy, it is contested between the Íslensk Premier League champions and a team representing the Rest of Iceland.

List of champions 
This list shows the winners of competitions that still take place in Iceland.

Grounds
Iceland's first purpose-built cricket ground, the most northerly in the world, opened in Hafnarfjörður in May 2019 and was officially inaugurated by Katrín Jakobsdóttir, the Prime Minister of Iceland. Previously the country had no turf wicket, with matches being played on astroturf football pitches.

References

External links
Krikketsamband Íslands